The fourth USS Despatch, originally USS Steam Cutter No. 423, later USS Hustle (YFB-6), was a ferry launch that served in the United States Navy from 1902 to 1921.

Steam Cutter No. 423 was a steam-powered wooden-hulled ferry launch placed in service at the Naval Training Station, Newport, Rhode Island, in 1902.  In 1908 she was renamed USS Despatch and on 11 April 1918 USS Hustle.  Hustle was designated YFB-6 in 1921.

Hustle was taken out of service in 1921, having spent her entire Navy career at Newport.

References
  for USS Hustle (YFB-6)''
 NavSource Photo Archives: Yard Ferryboat or Launch (YFB) Index

World War I auxiliary ships of the United States
Ferries of the United States Navy